This list of music schools in the United Kingdom includes all tertiary level conservatoires, vocational music schools and specialist music schools for school-aged children.

England

Scotland

Wales

 Cardiff University School of Music
 Royal Welsh College of Music & Drama
 Wales International Academy of Voice

British music-related lists
 
United Kingdom education-related lists